The Ballymena, Cushendall and Red Bay Railway was a  narrow gauge railway between Ballymena and Retreat, both in County Antrim, in what is now Northern Ireland. It operated from 1875 to 1940.

History

The railway line was incorporated in 1872, opened in May 1875 and was the first narrow gauge railway in Ireland to be sanctioned by Parliament. It was essentially a mineral railway which ran for 16 miles from Ballymena to Retreat. It served iron mines in the area, which were connected to the mainline by sidings and branch lines, some of which were owned by mining companies. Initially it was financially successful, but later the market collapsed and in October 1884 it was taken over by the Belfast and Northern Counties Railway (BNCR), the sale having been approved by Parliament on 14 July 1884. In 1886 the first passenger trains were introduced, which terminated at Parkmore, some 2 miles from Retreat.

For most of the route from Ballymena trains had to struggle against the gradient taking 50 minutes for the northbound journey and returning in 40 minutes. To reach the tourist areas of Cushendall and Glenariff, passengers had to hire road transport from the Parkmore terminus. At the start three Black Hawthorn 0-4-2ST engines were used, but these were replaced by the BNCR. Passengers were transported in tramway type bogie carriages. Passenger traffic ceased in 1930 and goods traffic ceased in 1940.

Route
Ballymena railway station
Ballygarvey railway station, 2-miles, open for passenger traffic 01/10/1888 to final closure 01/10/1930.
Ballycloughan railway station, 4-miles, open for passenger traffic from 05/04/1886 to 01/10/1930, goods & final closure 03/06/1940.
Rathkenny railway station, 6-miles, open for passenger traffic from 05/04/1886 to 01/10/1930, goods closure 12/04/1937, final closure 03/06/1940.
Clough Road railway station, 6-miles, open for passenger traffic from 05/04/1886, goods, passenger & final closure 01/10/1930.
Knockanally railway station (renamed Martinstown 01/07/1920), 8-miles, open for passenger traffic from 05/04/1886 to 01/10/1930, goods & final closure 12/04/1937.
Cross Roads railway station (formerly Carrowcowan), 9-miles, open for passenger traffic from 01/08/1886. Goods, passenger & final closure 01/10/1930.
Cargan railway station, 11-miles, open for passenger traffic from 01/06/1889 to 01/10/1930, goods closure 07/1923, final closure 12/04/1937.
Parkmore railway station, 13-miles, open for passenger traffic from 01/09/1888. Goods, passenger & final closure 01/10/1930.
Retreat railway station (County Antrim), 16-miles.

See also
Ballycastle Railway
Ballymena and Larne Railway
List of narrow gauge railways in Ireland

References

Closed railways in Northern Ireland
Transport in County Antrim
Railway companies established in 1872
3 ft gauge railways in Ireland
Defunct railway companies of Ireland